The Meyer wavelet is an orthogonal wavelet proposed by Yves Meyer. As a type of a continuous wavelet, it has been applied in a number of cases, such as in adaptive filters, fractal random fields, and multi-fault classification.

The Meyer wavelet is infinitely differentiable with infinite support and defined in frequency domain in terms of function  as

 

where
 

There are many different ways for defining this auxiliary function, which yields variants of the Meyer wavelet.
For instance, another standard implementation adopts
 

The Meyer scale function is given by

 

In the time domain, the waveform of the Meyer mother-wavelet has the shape as shown in the following figure:

Close expressions
Valenzuela and de Oliveira  give the explicit expressions of Meyer wavelet and scale functions:

 

and

 

where

References

External links 

 wavelet toolbox
 Matlab implementation

Wavelets